Jack Howarth (born 22 October 2002) is an Australian professional rugby league footballer who plays as a  and  for the Melbourne Storm in the NRL.

Background
Howarth played his junior rugby league for Easts Tigers and attended Brisbane Boys' College, Brisbane before being signed by the Melbourne Storm.

In June 2022, Howarth was selected for the Queensland U19s junior State of Origin team for their match against NSW. Howarth suffered a head injury in the second half and was unable to return to the field.

External Links
Melbourne Storm profile

References

2002 births
Living people
Australian rugby league players
Melbourne Storm players
Rugby league players from Rockhampton, Queensland